The 2018 Slovak Open was a professional tennis tournament played on indoor hard courts. It was the 19th edition of the tournament which was part of the 2018 ATP Challenger Tour. It took place in Bratislava, Slovakia between 5 and 11 November 2018.

Singles main-draw entrants

Seeds

 1 Rankings are as of 29 October 2018.

Other entrants
The following players received wildcards into the singles main draw:
  Norbert Gombos
  Lukáš Klein
  Tomáš Líška
  Alex Molčan

The following player received entry into the singles main draw using a protected ranking:
  Egor Gerasimov

The following players received entry into the singles main draw as alternates:
  Filip Horanský
  Uladzimir Ignatik

The following players received entry from the qualifying draw:
  Alexander Bublik
  Johannes Härteis
  Daniel Masur
  Jurij Rodionov

Champions

Singles

 Alexander Bublik def.  Lukáš Rosol 6–4, 6–4.

Doubles

 Denys Molchanov /  Igor Zelenay def.  Ramkumar Ramanathan /  Andrei Vasilevski 6–2, 3–6, [11–9].

References

2018 ATP Challenger Tour
2018
2018 in Slovak tennis
November 2018 sports events in Europe